Epidermophyton is a genus of fungus causing superficial and cutaneous mycoses, including E. floccosum, and causes tinea corporis (ringworm), tinea cruris (jock itch), tinea pedis (athlete's foot), and tinea unguium (fungal infection of the nail bed).

References

External links
Doctor Fungus
Mycology Unit at the Adelaide Women's and Children's Hospital

Parasitic fungi
Eurotiomycetes genera
Arthrodermataceae